This is a new event in the ITF Women's Circuit in 2016.

Elitsa Kostova won the title, defeating Viktoriya Tomova in an all-Bulgarian final, 6–0, 7–6(7–3).

Seeds

Main draw

Finals

Top half

Bottom half

References 
 Main draw

Europe Tennis Center Ladies Open - Singles